Associazione Sportiva Dilettantistica OltrepòVoghera, usually referred to as simply OltrepòVoghera, was an Italian association football team from Stradella and Voghera Lombardy.

History

Foot-Ball Club Casteggio Broni 
The club was founded in 2001 as Foot-Ball Club Casteggio Broni in Casteggio, Lombardy, after the merger with F.C. Casteggio and A.C. Broni. Its colors were yellow and blue.

A.S.D. S.B.C. Oltrepò 
At the end of the 2008–09 Serie D season, the club, in financial difficulties, moved to the city of Stradella and merged with Società Ginnastica Stradellina (founded in 2006 and direct heir of Oltrepò Calcio, that played in Serie C2 in the '80s), changing its denomination in A.S.D. S.B.C. Oltrepò.

A.S.D. OltrepòVoghera 
In the summer 2013 the club merged with A.S. Accademia Team Anni Verdi Voghera and was renamed with the current name. In the 2013–14 season it was promoted to Serie D.

OltrepoVoghera went on playing in Serie D until 2019, when it was relegated to Eccellenza Lombardia. After that, the club was sold to businessman Oreste Cavaliere, who decided to rename it A.S.D. AVC Vogherese 1919, to re-create Voghera's historic football club.

Colors and badge 
The colors of the team were light blue, white, red and black.

Honours
 Coppa Italia Dilettanti
 Winners: 1976–77

References 

Football clubs in Italy
Association football clubs established in 2001
Football clubs in Lombardy
Serie C clubs
2001 establishments in Italy
Phoenix clubs (association football)